Great Americans may refer to:
 Great Americans series, a set of definitive stamps issued by the United States Postal Service from 1980 through 2002
 GreatAmericans.com, an online video site
 Hall of Fame for Great Americans, an outdoor sculpture garden in Bronx Community College in The Bronx, New York City

See also
Great American (disambiguation)